Odesa International Medical University (Ukrainian: Одеський Міжнародний Медичний Університет) abbreviated as OIMU (Ukrainian: ОМMУ) is a Ukrainian higher learning institution located in Odesa. Because of its strong medical research base & advanced scientific units, the university is considered as the most influential medical institutes in Ukraine.

The university offers undergraduate, postgraduate and doctoral programs with a strong emphasis on medical specialties like general medicine (MD/MBBS), somatology (Dentistry), nursing, pharmacy, veterinary medicine, biomedical engineering and agricultural engineering.

All medical degrees of the university issued for foreign graduates are recognized and listed in the International Medical Education Directory (IMED), WHO (World Health Organization), Medical Council of Europe, General Medical Council (limited Registration) of UK, Pakistan Medical & Dental Council (PMDC), Medical Council of Nigeria & other African countries as well.

Schools and departments 
Odesa International Medical University has the following six schools and 228 clinical and 76 theoretical departments. The university also has 11 clinical and health care centres and a renowned Research Institute of Traumatology and Orthopedics.

 School of Medicine
 School of Dentistry
 School of Nursing
 School of Pharmacy
 School of Postgraduation & Specialization
 School of Foreign Languages

Clinical centres and affiliated hospitals 
The university is affiliated with the following hospitals and clinical centres in Odesa.

 Perinatal Odesa Center
 Odesa Territory. Medical Health Association of the Child and Women
 Odesa City Hospital No.1
 Odesa City Hospital No.2
 Health Code Health Center
 Medical clinic “Medifast”
 Medical center “Adastra”
 Medical Center “AS Medikal”
 Dental Clinic “Doctor”
 Medical Rehabilitation Center “T-MEDIL”
 Health Clinic “Plus”

Programs 
Odesa International Medical University offers the following programs to its domestic and international students:

Ranking and reputation 

Medical degrees obtained from Odesa International Medical University have recently been blacklisted by the British General Medical Council (GMC). Blacklisting is based on information that shows the qualification doesn't meet the GMC's criteria, such as questionable ethics, teaching and integrity of the medical programme, including examinations and medical rotations being inadequate or simply lied about.

GMC: "We only place a medical school on this list once we have carried out a full investigation and concluded that it is the most appropriate course of action." - As such, it is recommended that British students looking to return to their home country following graduation avoid this university at all costs.

International Student's Department 

At present, students from Germany, France, Spain, Poland, Denmark, USA, UK, Russia, South Africa, India, Pakistan, Nigeria, Ghana, Morocco, Egypt, Uzbekistan, Kazakhstan, Israel, Nepal, Bangladesh, UAE, Zambia, Namibia and above 55 other countries are studying at different schools of the university.

Food services 

There is a catering system in the hostels of the university for all the students who are residing in the dormitories. From European to Indian food, a large variety of dishes is offered by the catering complex. Halal food is also available separately for the students from Muslim and Arabic countries.

References

External link
Odesa International Medical University website

International universities
Dental schools
Universities in Ukraine
Universities and colleges in Odesa
Medical schools in Ukraine